The Front Bottoms are an American rock band from Woodcliff Lake, New Jersey consisting of lead vocalist and guitarist Brian Sella and drummer Mat Uychich.

History

The group formed in 2006 in Woodcliff Lake, New Jersey. In August 2007, after Brian Sella (vocals, guitar, lyricist) finished his first year of college, he and childhood friend Mathew Uychich (drums) began playing together under the name The Front Bottoms. Soon after, Uychich's brother, Brian Uychich, (keyboard, vocals) began sitting in on their practices. Brian asked to join the band, playing an old keyboard he found in the Uychich family attic. This completed the original lineup, with which the first two albums and EP were recorded.

They spent the next few years playing locally around New Jersey and eventually doing extensive tours around the country. In between tours, Sella worked at a grocery store and Uychich worked in landscaping. During this time, they put out a self-released album, I Hate My Friends, in 2008.Then they released an EP, Brothers Can't Be Friends, the same year. They released a second album in 2009, My Grandma vs Pneumonia. Additionally, a five-song cassette, Calm Down and Breathe, was handmade by the band in 2009, and limited to 30 copies. They were part of the New Brunswick-based artist collective Tiny Giant.

Around 2010, the band started writing material for what would become their self-titled album. They released an EP called Slow Dance To Soft Rock which contained six tracks later remastered for the LP. A second EP, Grip N' Tie, was planned to be released later that year but was canceled. The songs that were on it were instead combined with the previous EP to produce an entire album. In late 2010, the band filmed a music video for "Maps", after being contacted through Myspace by an anonymous filmmaker, which gave them great exposure. On June 2, 2011, the band had announced that they signed with Bar/None Records and would release their self-titled debut studio album on September 6, 2011.

As of late 2010, Brian Uychich left the band to concentrate on school full-time. The Front Bottoms replaced Uychich with a new touring musician, Drew Villafuerte, who played bass in addition to keyboards. In 2012, Villafuerte stopped touring with the band as well, citing the extensive touring as too difficult. He was replaced by Tom Warren and Ciaran O'Donnell.

In March 2013, the band released a video for "Twin Size Mattress" on YouTube in the promotion of their next record. Their second studio album, Talon of the Hawk, was released on May 21, 2013.

On June 17, 2014, the band released a six song EP, Rose. The EP was named for Matthew Uychich's grandmother Rosemary, who is depicted in the cover art. The music video for "Twelve Feet Deep" shows the band, along with audience members at a live show, wearing masks of Rosemary's face as depicted on the album cover.

On April 18, 2015, Run for Cover and Bar/None Records released two songs by the band, and two songs by rapper GDP on Liberty and Prosperity, a split EP. In June 2015, it was announced they had signed to the label Fueled by Ramen The Front Bottoms released their third studio album Back on Top on September 18, 2015, via Fueled by Ramen.

On March 7, 2016, they released a new song, "Noodle Monster", on the Fueled by Ramen YouTube Channel. On June 26, 2016, Pitchfork released a music video for the song "Ginger" from Back on Top. The video was directed by Marlon Brandope and shot in Cranston, Rhode Island.

Preceded by the single "Raining", the band released their fourth studio album, Going Grey, on October 13, 2017. 

In an interview in February 2018, Sella confirmed the release of the Ann EP, the second in the 'Grandma series'. The EP was released on May 18, 2018, via Fueled by Ramen, and a music video for its final song, "Tie Dye Dragon", was released on March 16.

On December 20, 2019, they released the song "Camouflage" and an accompanying music video. This was followed by the song "Everyone Blooms" and its video on April 17, 2020.

On July 3, 2020, the band announced their album In Sickness & in Flames and released the song "Montgomery Forever" with its video. On August 14, 2020, they released the song "Fairbanks, Alaska", and the album on August 21, 2020.

On September 2, 2022, the band released the Theresa EP with five re-recorded versions of unreleased fan favorites and oldies that serve as the third installment of the band's popular Grandma EP series.

Band members

Current members
Brian Sella – vocals, guitar (2007–present)
Mathew Uychich – drums (2007–present)

Touring musicians
Tom Warren – bass guitar, vocals (2012–2017), guitar, vocals (2017–2019)
Erik Kase Romero – bass, guitar, backing vocals (2017–present)
Drew Villafuerte – bass, keys (2010–2012)
Jenn Fantaccione – violin, trumpet, cello, backing vocals (2017–2019)
Roshane Karunaratne – keys, melodica, keytar (2017–2019)
Natalie Newbold – bass, backing vocals (2020–present)
AJ Peacox – guitar, backing vocals (2022–present)
Brian Uychich – keys, backing vocals (2007–2010)
Ciaran O'Donnell – guitar, trumpet, keys (2012–2017)

Timeline

Discography

Studio albums

Extended plays

Singles

Music videos

 "Maps" (2010)
 "Swimming Pool" (2011)
 "Flashlight" (2011)
 "Christmas Wrapping" (2011)
 "Mountain" (2013)
 "Twin Size Mattress" (2013)
 "Skeleton" (2013)
 "Funny You Should Ask" (2013)
 "Backflip" (2014)
 "12 Feet Deep" (2014)
 "West Virginia" (2015)
 "Cough It Out" (2015)
 "HELP" (2015)
 "Laugh Till I Cry" (2015)
 "Summer Shandy" (2015)
 "Ginger" (2016)
 "2YL" (2016)
 "Raining" (2017)
 "Vacation Town" (2017)
 "Peace Sign" (2017)
 "Everyone But You" (2018)
 "Lonely Eyes" (2018)
 "Tie Dye Dragon" (2018)
 "camouflage" (2019)
 "everyone blooms." (2020)
 "montgomery forever" (2020)
 "Fairbanks, Alaska" (2020)
 "Voodoo Magic" (2021)

Notes

References

External links
 

2006 establishments in New Jersey
Emo musical groups from New Jersey
Indie rock musical groups from New Jersey
Folk punk groups
Fueled by Ramen artists
Indie pop groups from New Jersey
Musical groups established in 2006
Musical quartets
Musical groups from New Jersey